Double indemnity is a clause or provision in a life insurance or accident policy. 

Double indemnity may also refer to:

 Double Indemnity (novel), a 1943 crime novel by James M. Cain.
Double Indemnity, a 1944 American film noir adaptation of Cain's novel, directed by Billy Wilder.
 Double Indemnity (1973 film), a 1973 TV film remake of the 1944 film, directed by Jack Smight
 "Double Indemnity", a short story by science fiction writer Robert Sheckley